The Lady Lies is a 1929 American Pre-Code drama film directed by Hobart Henley, and starring Walter Huston, Claudette Colbert and  Charles Ruggles. As was common during the early sound era, multiple-language versions were shot at the Joinville Studios in Paris for release in their respective markets including a Swedish version The Two of Us.

Plot
Children of a widower who is having an affair with a salesgirl try to break it up but are won over by the girl.

Cast
Walter Huston as Robert Rossiter 
Claudette Colbert as Joyce Roamer
Charles Ruggles as  Charlie Tayler
Tom Brown as Bob Rossiter 
Betty Garde as Hilda Pearson 
Jean Dixon  as Ann Gardner 
Duncan Penwarden as Henry Tuttle 
Virginia True Boardman as  Amelia Tuttle

Filming locations
Paramount Studios - 5555 Melrose Ave., Hollywood, Los Angeles, California.

Notes

External links
  
 
 

1929 films
American black-and-white films
Paramount Pictures films
1929 drama films
American drama films
Films produced by Walter Wanger
1920s English-language films
Films with screenplays by Garrett Fort
Films shot in Los Angeles
1920s American films